Katherine Torrance (born 10 October 1998) is a British diver.

Torrance was born in Croydon. Her senior European debut came in 2016. Later that year, she won two gold medals and one bronze medal at the World Junior Championship competition. She competed in the women's 1 metre springboard event at the 2019 World Aquatics Championships.

She competed in the 2018 Commonwealth Games where she won a silver medal in the synchronized 3 metre springboard event alongside Alicia Blagg.

She finished sixth in the women's synchronized 3 metre springboard event alongside Grace Reid in the 2020 Summer Olympics.

References

External links
 
 
 
 
 

1998 births
Living people
British female divers
Place of birth missing (living people)
Olympic divers of Great Britain
Divers at the 2020 Summer Olympics
European Games medalists in diving
European Games gold medalists for Great Britain
Divers at the 2015 European Games
Commonwealth Games medallists in diving
Commonwealth Games silver medallists for England
Divers at the 2018 Commonwealth Games
Medallists at the 2018 Commonwealth Games